The Tahoe sucker (Catostomus tahoensis) is a freshwater Cypriniform fish inhabiting the Great Basin region of the Western United States.

Description
The Tahoe sucker is a large, long fish with a tapering head. It can grow up to 24 inches in larger lakes. Its rather large suckermouth is located on the bottom of the head. The caudal fin is moderately forked. There are 83 to 87 scales in the lateral line. They are very dark above, lighter below, with dusky fins. Breeding males display a bright red lateral line.

Distribution and habitat
These fish are native to the Lahontan Basin of southeastern Oregon, Nevada, and northeastern California, of which it is one of the most common fishes. It has also been introduced into the upper Sacramento River system. The total adult population is believed to number over 100,000, and it is considered to be common or abundant in its various habitats.

They are mainly found in large lakes and reservoirs, but can also be found in ponds in lower reaches of streams. Adults occupy moderate depths. Young are found in shallow waters or tributary streams.

Diet habits
Tahoe suckers are largely herbivorous, but have also been found to feed on insects and mirco-crustaceans.

Reproduction
Tahoe suckers reach sexual maturity between 2 and 5 years of age, with males tending to mature earlier. Differences in age at which maturity is reached exist between various populations. Those in Pyramid Lake mature several years earlier than those in Lake Tahoe. Fecundity is believed to be related to size, with age being of secondary influence.   Nuptial tubercles begin appear on both sexes prior to the onset of the mating season, although they are rare on females. On males they form distinct rows on the anal and caudal fins.

The Tahoe sucker prefers to spawn over rock and gravel substrates. After scattering her eggs into the gravel bed, the female shakes them down into the substrate. Simultaneously, the attendant males release their sperm in order to fertilize the released eggs.

Importance to humans
Historically, the Tahoe sucker was largely ignored by the indigenous Paiute peoples, who preferred Cutthroat trout and Cui-ui sucker. Despite the fish's size and good taste, it continues to have no economic significance.

References

Tahoe sucker
Endemic fauna of the United States
Fish of the Western United States
Freshwater fish of the United States
Fauna of California
Fauna of the Great Basin
Natural history of Nevada
Natural history of Oregon
Taxa named by Theodore Gill
Taxa named by David Starr Jordan
Tahoe sucker